The 2020–21 season of Atlético Petróleos de Luanda is the club's 40th season in the Girabola, the Angolan Premier football League and 40th consecutive season in the top flight of Angolan football. In 2020–21,  the club is participating in the Girabola, the Angola Cup and the CAF Champions League.

Squad information

Staff

Pre-season transfers

Mid-season transfers

Overview

Angolan League
The 2020-21 season of the Girabola kicked off on December 26, 2020 with Petro de Luanda making their debut on December 28 in a home match win against Bravos do Maquis.

League table

Match details

Results

Results by round

Results summary

CAF Champions League

Group stage

First round

Preliminary round

Results summary

Angola Cup

Preliminary round

Round of 16

Quarter-finals

Semi-finals

Final

Season statistics

Appearances

Scorers

Assists

Clean sheets

Disciplinary record

Season progress

See also
 List of Atlético Petróleos de Luanda players

Notes

External links
 PetroLuanda.co.ao Official club website 
 Match schedule
 Girabola.com profile
 Zerozero.pt profile
 Facebook profile

References

Atlético Petróleos de Luanda seasons
Petro de Luanda